Get Crunk, Who U Wit: Da Album is the debut studio album by American Southern hip hop group Lil Jon & the East Side Boyz.

Track listing
 "Album Intro" – 0:26
 "Bounce Dat Ass" – 5:38
 "Shake Your Booty" – 5:41
 "Get Crunk (Intro)" – 0:49
 "Get Crunk" – 4:24
 "Who U Wit? (Intro)" – 0:49
 "Who U Wit?" – 4:24
 "Shawty Freak a Lil' Sumtin' (Intro)" – 0:14
 "Shawty Freak a Lil' Sumtin" – 4:07
 "Giddy Up Let's Ride / Giddy Up Let's Ride (Outro)" – 4:02 (3:35 / 0:27)
 "Who U Wit? (Bass Remix)" – 4:15
 "Cut Up (Intro)" – 1:15
 "Cut Up" – 4:05
 "Y'all Don't Feel Me" – 4:50
 "ATL (Intro)" – 0:25
 "ATL" – 3:57
 "Sign Off" – 0:33

Bonus track (2001)
 "2 Step Drop (Last Man Standing)" – 6:25

Single
"Shawty Freak a Lil' Sumtin'"

References

1997 debut albums
Albums produced by DJ Toomp
Albums produced by Lil Jon
Lil Jon & the East Side Boyz albums